(5 November 194926 September 2020) often known by his stage name Louise Louis, was a half-French and half-Japanese bassist and guitarist from Yokohama, Japan. He began his career in 1966 as a member of The Golden Cups. He was a studio musician throughout the 1970s and also a member of various bands such as Speed, Glue & Shinki until he permanently joined the supergroup Pink Cloud (a.k.a. Johnny, Louis & Char) in 1978. After they disbanded in 1994 he formed the instrumental side-project ZZK while providing support to other musicians as a bassist. 
He also recorded four albums as bass player with the band Vodka Collins from 1995 to 1998. He died on 26 September 2020, of multiple organ failure.

References

External links 
 

1949 births
2020 deaths
Japanese musicians
Japanese people of French descent
People from Yokohama
Musicians from Kanagawa Prefecture